Cleonaria is a genus of longhorn beetles of the subfamily Lamiinae.

 Cleonaria bicolor Thomson, 1864
 Cleonaria cingalensis Gahan, 1901

References

Astathini
Cerambycidae genera